Starring Sally J. Freedman as Herself is a 1977  young adult novel by Judy Blume. The story is set in 1947 and follows the imaginative 10-year-old Sally, who likes to make up stories in her head, her family moves from New Jersey to Miami Beach. While not as controversial as some of her other novels, Blume does manage to address the following themes of late 1940s life in America: racism, anti-Semitism and sibling rivalry. This novel is her most autobiographical, with many parallels between Blume's own life and that of Sally. Blume has said, "Sally is the kind of kid I was at ten."

Plot

Sally J. Freedman moves from New Jersey to Miami, Florida with her brother and their mother and grandmother at the end of World War II. This is because of her brother Douglas's health, for he caught nephritis from staying in wet clothes in the cold. The novel first touches on racism when, on the train to Florida, Sally meets a black woman traveling with her young sons about Sally's age and her infant daughter whom Sally gets to hold. The next day, Sally goes back to visit the black family and discovers that laws requiring racial segregation in the 1940s in the Southern United States force the family to move to another car on the train. Sally is infuriated and does not understand why her mother is not upset as well. Before Sally can be admitted to her new school, she must undergo a physical examination in which the school nurse discovers nits (head louse eggs) in Sally's hair. The school nurse tries to calm Sally's mother, who is insulted and taking the news personally, by saying, "Look Mrs. Freedman, don't take this personally. You've been traveling, she could have picked them up anywhere."

In her new school, she meets new friends, the first being Barbara, who teaches Sally all about the new school. Later, she meets Andrea, a sixth grader, and Shelby, a girl in a different class than Sally. She has a difficult first day at school, but after a while, she begins to make more friends. There, she meets Peter Hornstein, a so-called 'Latin Lover', who seems to like Sally, but Peter ignores Sally when Jackie, a new girl, arrives at the school. It troubles Sally that Peter is going after a different girl, and she begins to like Peter back. She also meets Harriet Goodman, who takes an instant disliking of her simply because she's a "snowbird".

A central part in the story is when Sally meets a man named Mr. Zavodsky, who lives in her building in Miami. He offers Andrea and her candy. Sally refuses the candy even though Andrea accepts it, which makes Sally upset. Sally, who is Jewish, notices that Mr. Zavodsky looks similar to Adolf Hitler and comes to believe (because of her active imagination) that he is actually Hitler, in disguise and retiring in Miami.

Another important plotline is when Sally finds out that her father, who had just turned 42, was exactly the same age as his two brothers had been when they died. Sally, who is superstitious, is worried that her father may die in his 42nd year, because of the well-known superstition 'all bad things happen in threes'.

Sally writes (but never mails) a lot of letters to Mr. Zavodsky, always saying she will get him someday. She spies on him, secretly listening to their phone conversations on a party line. She worries at one point Mr. Zavodsky killed her friend Shelby, and she believes the rock candy he offers is actually poison. In the end, Mr. Zavodsky dies of a heart attack.

In the one year Sally spends at Miami, she learns how babies are made, attends but loses a contest, drinks whiskey while attempting to make Creme de Cacao, kisses Peter at their teacher's wedding, and in the end, strengthens her relationship with her family members.

At the very end, Sally and her family return to New Jersey.

Themes
This historical novel focuses on a young adolescent growing up in the post-World War II United States. Other themes include sibling rivalry, making friends, bigotry and antisemitism.

Numerous references are made to technology and cultural events in post-World War II America such as party telephone lines and rotary phones, train travel instead of plane travel, and rationing.

Racial segregation is also noted in this book, both from the above-mentioned situation on the train with the black family, and another incident where Sally inadvertently drank from a "colored" drinking fountain in a drug store and a woman pulled her off it and freaked out over what she might "catch" from it.

Characters
 Sally J. Freedman: The lead character in the story.
 Peter Hornstein: A boy who likes Sally and shows it by constantly teasing her.
 Andrea Rubin: One of Sally's best friends, even though she is a year older and in the Sixth grade. She is from Brooklyn.
 Barbara: Sally's first friend, who helps her adjust to the new school.  Her father was killed in World War II.
 Shelby: Sally's friend, a girl who goes to a different class than Sally and owns Sally's favorite game, Jolly Roger.
 Christine: Sally's best friend from New Jersey who starts to go by the name "Chrissy". 
 Douglas: Sally's 13-year-old brother, a loner with a sarcastic streak who is very smart (skipped third grade).
 Mr. Zavodsky: A man in Sally's building, who looks similar to and is assumed to be (by Sally) Adolf Hitler.
 Harriet Goodman: A classmate of Sally's who tells her she "hates her" because she doesn't live in Miami all year round like her.
 Darlene: Douglas' wealthy, amply-contoured new sweetheart.
 Georgia Blue Eyes: Andrea's love interest who calls Sally "Sally Nevermind".
 Vicki: The girlfriend (the story tells us she is not married to him) of Ted, a very pretty woman who looks like Rita Hayworth.
 Ted: The boyfriend of Vicki, a tall man from New York City who got rich through the stock market.
 Ma Fanny: Sally's maternal grandmother.
 Aunt Bette and Uncle Jack: Sally's and Douglas's aunt and uncle from Sally's mother's side of the family.
 Miss Swetnick: Sally's teacher, who is very pretty and is engaged to be married to Peter Hornstein's older brother, Hank.
 Hank: Peter Hornstein's older brother.
 Tante Rose: Sally and Douglas's great aunt.  She is only mentioned in the novel, as she was killed at Dachau.  
 Lila: Sally and Douglas's cousin twice removed.  She was killed at Dachau with her mother Tante Rose and appears in the novel only in Sally's daydreams.
 Louise: Sally and Douglas's mother, a stay-at-home mom. She worries just about everything.
 Arnold: Sally and Douglas's father, called "Doey-bird" by Sally because he whistles all the time. He is a dentist.
 Jackie: A girl in the story who Peter likes and Sally hates because Peter likes her.
 Omar: Andrea's pet cat.
 Alice and Betsy: Two friends of Sally's from New Jersey.
 Linda: Andrea's younger sister, a polio survivor. Her family is in Miami for the same reason as Sally's.

Real people mentioned
 Esther Williams: Sally's favorite movie star.
 Rita Hayworth: Mentioned briefly in the book. It is noted that Vicki looks like her.
 Margaret O'Brien: Another one of Sally's favorite stars.
 Adolf Hitler: German politician, leader of the Nazi party, turned dictator.
 Jane Russell: Actress whose low-cut blouse makes Douglas want to go see her in The Outlaw.
 Humphrey Bogart: Mentioned briefly, commenting on the appearance of the telephone delivery man.
 Bing Crosby: Mentioned in the prologue—he was singing on the radio.
 William Halsey, Jr. (Admiral Halsey): A fleet admiral in the U.S. Navy during World War II.

Popular songs mentioned in the novel include "Swinging on a Star" (the song Crosby is singing on the radio in the prologue), "Peg O' My Heart" (it is mentioned that Sally's classmate Harriet Goodman can play this song on the piano), and "Ballerina" (it is mentioned that this song, one of Sally's favorites, is number one on the Hit Parade charts).

External links
Judy Blume's website

1977 American novels
Fiction set in 1947
American young adult novels
Novels by Judy Blume
Novels set in Florida